The Kdam Eurovision (Hebrew: קדם אירוויזיון, transliteration "Kdam-Erovizyon", translation "Pre-Eurovision") in short known as the Kdam (Hebrew: קדם, lit. "Pre") was the Israeli national preselection of the Eurovision Song Contest. The competition was first introduced in 1981 and ran until 2014.

History of the Israeli song selection

1960s
In the 1960s, particularly with the 1963 Eurovision Song Contest, Israeli singers were able to represent other European countries rather than their home country, as this was before there were television broadcasts in Israel. That year, Israel was represented by Esther Ofarim for Switzerland (with a song in French), and Carmela Corren for Austria. Regular television broadcasts in Israel began in May 1968.

1970s
In 1972, Ilanit and Shlomo Zach argued that the Israel Broadcasting Authority (IBA) was entitled to participate in the Eurovision Song Contest, since it was a member of the European Broadcasting Union (EBU). IBA agreed and asked that Ilanit represent Israel at the Eurovision Song Contest in Edinburgh in 1972. But the registration period had already closed for the 1972 competition, thus Israel's first participation was delayed by one year. In 1973, Ilanit won the bid to represent Israel in Luxembourg at that year's Eurovision Song Contest, becoming the first official Israeli entry to Eurovision. A committee of the IBA was in charge of selecting the song. Ehud Manor and Nurit Hirsh wrote the chosen song, "Ey Sham" in Hebrew, although in that year's contest, entrants did not have to sing in their national languages. Manor explained that they saw the importance of having that song represent Israel in Hebrew, but were concerned that the tone of the words not be jarring to the ears of European listeners. Ilanit placed fourth in the first-ever Israeli entry.

In later years, a selection committee continued to choose the acts to be sent on behalf of Israel, including the band Kaveret with "Natati La Khayay" (7th place),  Shlomo Artzi with "At Va'Ani" (11th place), and the trio Chocolat, Menta, Mastik with "Emor Shalom" (6th place). In 1977 Israel sent back Ilanit for a second time, with "Ahava Hi Shir Lishnayim" (11th place).

After the second Ilanit showing in 1977, the method of voting was changed. In the next two years 1978 and 1979, Israel's Eurovision entrants were the winners in the Israel Song Festival (in Hebrew פסטיבל הזמר והפזמון פסטיבל, Festival HaZemer VeHaPizmon). In both cases, the songs won the Eurovision title. The songs were "A-Ba-Ni-Bi" by Izhar Cohen in 1978 and "Hallelujah" by Milk and Honey in 1979.

1980s
After winning with "Hallelujah", Israel had the right to host the 25th Eurovision contest, but the Israeli budget was not large enough to host two consecutive contests (Ireland being the only country to successfully host more than one contest in a row). Instead the competition took place that year in The Hague, Netherlands, and was set to Yom Hazikaron, forcing Israel to cancel its participation, although a selection contest had been organized and a winning song called "Pizmon Chozer" (meaning "Refrain" in English) had been chosen and was going to be interpreted by Ha'achim ve ha'achayot (meaning Brothers and sisters in English).

In 1981, it was decided to change the main selection process competition for Israeli artists through competition under Kdam Eurovision (or pre-Eurovision). The first such competition was held on 3 March 1981.

The band Hakol Over Habibi won the competition in 1981, for 26th Eurovision Contest in Dublin with the song "Halayla". Among the prominent Kdam songs that competed were "Cinderella" by Sexta, "Hora" by Avi Toledano and "Estate I" by Yigal Bashan.

The 1984 Eurovision Song Contest in Luxembourg was again set on Yom Hazikaron Memorial Day and Israel canceled its participation yet again. Israel had already picked the song "Balalaika" by singer Ilanit for the year's competition but without conducting any pre-Eurovision contest.

Kdam Eurovision Song Contest returned for 1985, 1986 and 1987. Among the prominent artists in this period were Yardena Arazi, Avi Toledano, Ofra Haza, Svika Pick, Ilana Avital, Izhar Cohen, Doron Mazar, Trio established specifically for the competition, Yigal Bashan, Uzi Hitman and Yonatan Miller, and the ensemble Izolirband.

In 1988, IBA suspended the Kdam competition as a cost-cutting measure and decided to send Yardena Arazi to Eurovision  in light of the achievements of previous competitions. Yardena Arazi performed four songs with selected the song "Ben Adam". Kdam returned in 1989, with Gili & Galit with "Derekh Hamelekh" but in 1990 Rita (actually Rita Kleinstein) was selected without competition one more time.

1990s
In 1991, 1992, 1993, 1995 and 1996, the Kdam Eurovision competitions were held (in 1994 Israel did not participate in the Eurovision Song Contest). The 1993 Kdam was won by the band Sarah'le Sharon and The Shiru Group, a band formed especially for the competition. It finished 24th place in the Eurovision Song Contest itself. Due to the changed policies in the Eurovision Song Contest (brought about by many Eastern European countries joining the competition), 24th place prevented Israel from participating in Eurovision Song Contest 1994. In 1996 Kdam was won by Galit Bell, an unknown singer at the time, whose song never managed to reach the Eurovision finals. This is because in that year the European Broadcasting Union reestablished an early selection process eliminating seven songs that they felt were the worst. The Israeli song "Hello World" was one of those seven.

In 1997, Eurovision was scheduled to take place on Yom HaShoah. A few months earlier, the Knesset passed an amendment to postpone Holocaust Remembrance Day by a day if it fell on a Saturday, Jewish Sabbath. IBA tried to register for competition after the Knesset decision, but late registration meant Israel could not compete.

In 1998, IBA decided to select the song through a committee. That year, Israel went on to win with the song "Diva" by Dana International. The following year, in 1999 the Eurovision Song Contest took place in Jerusalem, with the Israeli entry "Yom Huledet (Happy Birthday)" by Eden.

2000s
In 2000 IBA Authority's committee chose the song "Sameach" by PingPong, a band consisting of two journalists  Roy Arad and Guy Asif, with girls Yifat Giladi and Tahal Aden. The selection process caused controversy  after radio entertainer/writer Irit Linor, one of the committee members declared that she was uninterested. When Linor was asked whether she thought PingPong's singing stood a chance, Linor replied: "Who cares?". The band's performance was based mainly on provocative gimmicks with the music video performed with cucumbers (as a metaphor for male genitalia). In addition, the lyrics were considered by many as being shallow, superficial and stupid. The PingPong band members also declared their intention to appear on stage in Stockholm, where they would raise the flags of Israel and Syria (The song mentioned the words: "I have now a new friend from Damascus"; "I want to do it with him all day"). Opponents claimed to the band that Syria is an enemy state, hence raising the flag for the State of Israel is an embarrassment. Others said they were bothered with two controversial kisses, one between two men and one between two women. During the week before the Eurovision Song Contest, the band visited the Syrian community in Stockholm, to perform. The band eventually appeared on stage in Stockholm with the Israeli and Syrian flags.  Israel finished 22nd out of 24 songs.

In 2001, Kdam returned for one more year picking Tal Sondak who placed 16th with "En Davar". From 2002 to 2004, Israel chose  Sarit Hadad, Lior Narkis and David D'Or in a selection procedure similar to the selection of Yardena Arazi in 1988.

The Kdam Eurovision competition took place again in 2005, and was won by Shiri Maimon. She came in fourth in the Eurovision Song Contest itself. In 2006,  Eddie Butler won the Kdam. In 2007, Mordechai Shklar canceled the competition for budgetary reasons.

In 25–26 February 2008, Kdam Eurovision was broadcast, first by the Channel 2 concessionaire "Keshet", in cooperation between the IBA and the Israeli reality television show "Kokhav Nolad" modeled on the British Pop Idol and American Idol. The show had a pre-produced format in which the privately pre-selected artist (Boaz Mauda) presented 4 different songs in front of a panel of judges to by selection of the viewing public. The song "Ke'ilu Kan" was chosen. In 2009, Kdam Eurovision returned, to be produced by the IBA only. Noa and Palestinian-origin Mira Awad were pre-selected as a duo and performed four songs "There Must Be Another Way" ("Einaiych" in Hebrew) was chosen. In 2010, Harel Skaat was chosen by the IBA and upon presenting 4 songs, "Milim" was chosen.

In 2011, both the singer and the song were chosen by the public. IBA contacted various artists through their agents asking them to participate. The national final was broadcast on March 8, 2011  from the culture hall in Rishon LeZion. The winner was Dana International and her song "Ding Dong."

Prominent singers

Zvika Pick
The Israeli artist that has appeared the most in Kdam Eurovision competitions is Zvika Pick. Pick took part seven times but never won. However a song he wrote won the Eurovision itself. "Diva" was sung by Dana International.

Yardena Arazi
Singer Yardena Arazi represented Israel three times at the Eurovision and hosted the Eurovision  held in Jerusalem in 1979. Her first appearance in Kdam Eurovision Song Contest was in 1982 with the song "מוזיקה נשארת" (written by Shimrit Or and Henry Barter). She came in second. In 1983, she performed the song "שירו שיר אמן" also by Shimrit Or and Henry Barter, again coming second and just one point shy of the winning song. Years later Arazi revealed that there was an error in the vote counting, and that she was the true qualifier and not Ofra Haza. Arazi did not challenge the decision because she did not want to be seen as a "sore loser".  In 1984 Arazi was chosen to represent Israel without competition, but as the contest was held on Yom Hazikaron, she was forced to renounce her right when Israel withdrew that year. In 1985 Arazi participated for the third time in Kdam with the song "We'll get" written by Ehud Manor and Avi Toledano) and came in third. In 1987 she hosted the Kdam. In 1988 she was pre-selected performing 4 songs, with the song "Ben Adam" winning first place, but finished seventh in the Eurovision Song Contest.

Avi Toledano
Singer and composer Avi Toledano  took part for the first time in 1981 with the song "Carnival". In 1982 he won with "Hora" and represented Israel at the Eurovision Song Contest where he was runner-up. Both were his own compositions. In 1983 he composed the song "Hi" by Ofra Haza that finished as runner-up at the Eurovision Song Contest. In 1985 he wrote Yardena Arazi's song. In 1986 he won third place. In 1989 he returned as composer and performer finishing second. In 1991 he composed the song "Hava Nagila Discovered" sung by Uri Feynman.

Other prominent singers competing at Kdam Eurovision: 
Yigal Bashan  (1981, 1982, 1985)
Leah Lupatin (1981, 1985, 1989, 1992, 1995)
Shalva Berti (1985, 1992, 1995)
Doron Mazar (1985, 1986, 1993, 1996)
Zehava Ben (1992, 2005)
Shlomo Gronich (1981, 2006)
Daphna Armoni (1981, 2001)
Sarit Hadad twice
Etti Ankri, Riki Gal (1983), Corinne Elal (1985), Rita (1986), Boaz Sharabi (1986), David D'or (1993) have won once.
Ilana Avital appeared four times at Kdam Eurovision, but did not make it to Eurovision stage.

Israel at Eurovision

Contestants

See also
Music of Israel
Culture of Israel

Notes

References

External links
Home page for Kdam Eurovision
Kdam Eurovision 2009 information at One Jerusalem
Kdam Eurovision 2009 information at Eurovision
Kdam Eurovision 2006

Eurovision Song Contest selection events
Israeli television shows
Recurring events established in 1980
Channel 1 (Israel) original programming
Music competitions in Israel
Israel in the Eurovision Song Contest